Sathegala  is a village in the southern state of Karnataka, India. It is located in the Kollegal taluk of Chamarajanagar district.

Demographics
 India census, Sathegala had a population of 12503, with 6518 males and 5985 females.

Places of interest

Sathyagala attained fame due to the stay of the SriVaishnavite Guru Vedanta Desikan in the 14th century, when he had to save rare manuscripts like the Sruti-prakasha, a commentary on the Sri Bhashya of Ramanuja from the Muslim invaders to Srirangam in 1327.   

There is a temple for Sri Varadharaja Swamy known as Kote Varadharaja Perumal.  

Another famous and ancient temple is the Madhyarangam which has Sri Renganatha Swamy as the main Deity.  

Within one furlong of the handpost junction, there are two dargah on the road to Shivanasamudram waterfalls. The first one has a decorated in the open courtyard with three surrounding building and space for devotees to take rest and have food.  

The second Dargah is set in a sylvan surroundings some two furlongs from the junction on the opposite side of the street. On the right hand side of the village school, there is a tree worship temple with a big and ancient tree besides it.

Nearby attractions
The Sivanasamudram Falls is on the Kaveri River after the river has  wound its way through the rocks and ravines of the Deccan Plateau  and drops off to form waterfalls.

Schools
 Sathyagala School, Handpost junction. 
 Government primary school, Agrahara

See also
 Chamarajanagar
 Districts of Karnataka

Image Gallery

References

External links
 http://Chamarajanagar.nic.in/
http://srivaishnavam.com/desika_life_history.htm

Villages in Chamarajanagar district